Puma concolor couguar may refer to:

 Eastern cougar, now extinct
 North American cougar, once commonly found in eastern North America and still prevalent in the western half of the continent